Todaropsis eblanae, also known as the lesser flying squid, is a species of short finned squid in the monotypic genus Todaropsis of the family Ommastrephidae.

Description

This species possesses a terminal fin which is broadly rhomboidal, wider than it is long and posteriorly rounded. Its arms are stout, more than twice the length of head, and the tentacle club is slim, with four rows of suckers, not extending away from the tips on to the stalk.

Habitat
This species is associated with muddy substrates.

Biology
A total of 21 specimens were examined from examples caught in Galicia and different prey items which fell into three distinct types were found to be taken as prey by Todaropis eblanae these were bony fish, crustaceans and other cephalopods. The diet was found to be dominated by blue whiting Micromesistius poutassou, which was found to make up 43% of the prey taken. In Irish Waters Mueller's Pearlside (Maurolicus muelleri), a small mesopelagic fish, is a particularly important prey item of Todaropsis eblanae being found in and 34.7% of stomachs examined with prey remains.

in northern waters Todaropsis eblanae generally mate and spawn in the  summer and early autumn months, i.e. from June through to November. Hatching occurs in late autumn through to the early spring, i.e. from October up until March, producing juveniles in the first half of the year.

Distribution
Found in the eastern coastal waters of the North Atlantic and South Atlantic from Shetland to the Cape of Good Hope, and the Indian Ocean from the along the coasts of southern Africa, Madagascar and the Mascarenes north to the Timor Sea, and then along the western and south-eastern coasts of Australia.

Fisheries
This squid is one of the most abundant cephalopods in the Celtic Sea, even so it is usually caught as a bycatch by trawlers fishing for other species.

References

Squid
Molluscs of the Atlantic Ocean
Molluscs of the Indian Ocean
Molluscs of the Pacific Ocean
Marine molluscs of Europe
Cephalopods of Europe
Gliding animals
Cephalopods described in 1841